The 2019 Melbourne Storm season was the 22nd in the club's history, competing in the 2019 NRL season. The team was coached by Craig Bellamy, who coached the club for his 17th consecutive season. Melbourne Storm were captained by Cameron Smith, who had been the sole captain for the team since 2008. On 13 July 2019 Smith became the first NRL player to play 400 NRL games. On 31 August 2019 the Storm defeated the Manly Sea Eagles to win their fourth J. J. Giltinan Shield as the minor premiers.

Season summary

 Pre-season – New recruits took part in Melbourne Storm IDQ camp for pre season training before New Years. Tom Eisenhuth was awarded the IDQ Iron bar with special recognition to both Sandor Earl & Nicho Hynes.
 Round 1 – Prior to the commencement of play, the northern stand of AAMI Park was renamed "The Slater Stand" after Billy Slater. Storm defeated the Broncos 22–12 extending their winning streak in Round 1 to 17 seasons. Tom Eisenhuth makes Storm debut.
 Round 3 – Storm defeat the Panthers 32–2 in Bathurst, Marion Seve scores his first NRL try
 Round 5 – Cameron Smith becomes the game's highest ever points scorer  with penalty goal in the 48th minute. Smith finished the game on 2422 points. Sandor Earl made his debut for the Storm and also played his first game following a four year ban from the game.
 Round 9 – The NRL stage their first Magic Round at Brisbane's Suncorp Stadium. The Storm completed one of the biggest wins in the club's history dominating the Parramatta Eels 64-10. Will Chambers played game 200.
 Round 11 – The Storm defeat the Bulldogs away at Belmore Oval Sydney with Cameron Smith playing his 500th first grade game. Cameron Munster also played his 100th Game.
 Round 16 – Missing 7 players due to State of Origin, Storm win 16–14 against St George Illawarra. The game was notable due to the large number of milestones; with Cameron Smith scoring his 2500th career point, Sandor Earl played his 50th NRL game, Craig Bellamy coached his 300th win and both Tino Fa'asuamaleaui and Billy Walters making their playing debuts.
 Round 17 – Cameron Smith becomes the first NRL player to play in 400 NRL games in the Storm's 40-16 win over Cronulla.
 Round 19 – Cameron Smith captains his 300th NRL Game.
 Round 22 – The Storm lose to the Canberra Raiders 22–18 after leading 18–0 shortly before half time. This result meant that it was the Storm's worst collapse in the history of the club.
 Round 24 – Storm defeat the Manly Sea Eagles 36-6 and clinch the J. J. Giltinan Shield as the minor premiers for 2019. Nelson Asofa-Solomaona also played his 100th game.

Milestone games

Fixtures

Pre-season 
Source:

Regular season
Source:
(GP) - Golden Point extra time
(pen) - Penalty try

Finals 
Source:

Ladder

Coaching staff
Craig Bellamy – Head Coach
 Jason Ryles – Senior Assistant Coach
 Marc Brentnall – Assistant Coach
 Ben Jack – U/20s Head Coach
 Aaron Bellamy – Development Coach
 Ryan Hinchcliffe – Development Coach
 Frank Ponissi – Football Director
Ryan Hoffman – Football Administration Coordinator
 Nick Maxwell – Leadership Coach
 Craig McRae – Kicking & Catching Coach
 Billy Slater – Specialist Coach (Part time)
 Scott Sipple – Easts Tigers Feeder Club Coach
 Craig Ingebrigtsen – Sunshine Coast Falcons Feeder Club Coach

2019 Squad
List current as of 24 March 2019
(a): This column denotes the previous RL club the player was signed to and played first grade RL for. If they are yet to debut then this is stipulated. If they were merely signed to the club but did not play then it is not counted.

Player movements
Source:

Losses
Cheyse Blair to Castleford Tigers (mid season)
Scott Drinkwater to North Queensland Cowboys (mid season)
Louis Geraghty to Gold Coast Titans
 Tim Glasby to Newcastle Knights
 Ryan Hoffman to Retired
 Ryley Jacks to Gold Coast Titans
Sam Kasiano to Catalans Dragons (mid season)
 Billy Slater to Retired
Lachlan Timm to Gold Coast Titans
 Sale Finau to Newcastle Knights
 Junior Ratuva to Canterbury Crusaders
 Patrick Kaufusi to St George Illawarra Dragons (mid season)

Gains
Nicho Hynes from Sunshine Coast Falcons
Solomone Kata from New Zealand Warriors (mid season)
Max King from Gold Coast Titans (mid season)
Isaac Lumelume from Cronulla Sharks (mid season)

Representative honours
The following players have played a first grade representative match in 2019.

Statistics 
Statistics Source:
Statistics current as of the end of the 2019 NRL regular season (this table does not include finals matches)

Scorers

Most Points in a Game: 18 points 

 Round 9: Cameron Smith (9 Goals) vs Parramatta Eels

Most tries in a Game: 3 

 Round 2: Suliasi Vunivalu vs. Canberra Raiders
 Round 24: Justin Olam vs. Manly Sea Eagles

Winning Games

Highest score in a winning game: 64 points

 Round 9: vs. Parramatta Eels

Lowest score in a winning game: 13 points

 Round 7 vs. New Zealand Warriors

Greatest winning margin: 54 points

 Round 9: vs. Parramatta Eels

Greatest number of Games won consecutively: 9

 Round 9 to Round 18

Losing Games

Highest score in a losing game: 20 points

 Round 6: vs. Sydney Roosters

Lowest score in a losing game: 10 points

 Round 19: vs. Manly Sea Eagles

Greatest losing margin: 4 points

 Round 22: vs. Canberra Raiders

Jersey
On 7 February the Storm announced that the 2019 Jersey will remain the same from 2018 however with updated NRL logos and the new 2019 Melbourne Storm logo. In addition the jersey now features the new Storm sponsor Purple Bricks.

# Designed by Lenny Briggs.
^ Special jersey designed for Cameron Smith's 400th NRL game.
^^ Heritage jersey inspired by the 2009 home jersey; celebrating both the 1999 NRL Grand Final premiership and 2009 NRL Grand Final winning teams.
& Women in League jersey featuring pink thunderbolts motif.

Awards

Trophy Cabinet
2019 J. J. Giltinan Shield
2019 Michael Moore Trophy

Melbourne Storm Awards Night
Held at Crown Palladium, Melbourne on Tuesday 8 October.
 Melbourne Storm Player of the Year: Dale Finucane
 Billy Slater Rookie of the Year: Ryan Papenhuyzen
 Melbourne Storm Members' Player of Year: Cameron Smith
 Melbourne Storm Most Improved: Tui Kamikamica
 Melbourne Storm Best Back: Jahrome Hughes
 Melbourne Storm Best Forward: Cameron Smith
 Cooper Cronk Feeder Club Player of the Year: Harry Grant
 Darren Bell U20s Player of the Year: Trent Toelau
 Greg Brentnall Young Achievers Award: 
 Mick Moore Club Person of the Year:
 Life Member Inductee: Will Chambers
 Chairman's Award:
 Best Try: Josh Addo-Carr Semi-Final vs Eels

Dally M Awards Night
Held at The Star, Sydney on Wednesday 2 October 2019.
 Dally M Coach of the Year: Craig Bellamy
 Dally M Captain of the Year: Cameron Smith
 Dally M Hooker of the Year: Cameron Smith
 Dally M Five-Eight of the Year: Cameron Munster
 Dally M Interchange Player of the Year: Brandon Smith

Rugby League Players’ Association Awards Night
 RLPA Indigenous Academic Excellence Award: Josh Addo-Carr
 RLPA Five-Eighth of the Year: Cameron Munster
 RLPA Hooker of the Year: Cameron Smith
 RLPA Second Rower of the Year: Kenny Bromwich

Additional Awards
 I Don't Quit Iron Bar: Tom Eisenhuth
 Spirit of ANZAC Medal: Cameron Smith
 NSWRL True Blue Award: Josh Addo-Carr

References

Melbourne Storm seasons
Melbourne Storm season